The Kalamazoo Quest was a W-League club based in Kalamazoo, Michigan. The team folded after the 1999 season.

Year-by-year

Defunct USL W-League (1995–2015) teams
Soccer clubs in Michigan
1998 establishments in Michigan
1999 disestablishments in Michigan
Association football clubs established in 1998
Association football clubs disestablished in 1999
Sports in Kalamazoo, Michigan
Women's sports in Michigan